Alvirabad (also Romanized as Alvīrābād) is a village in Jafarabad Rural District, Jafarabad District, Qom County, Qom Province, Iran. At the 2006 census, its population was 462, in 100 families.

References 

Populated places in Qom Province